A configure script is an executable script designed to aid in developing a program to be run on a wide number of different computers. It matches the libraries on the user's computer, with those required by the program before compiling it from its source code.

As a common practice, all configure scripts are named configure. Usually, configure scripts are written for the Bourne shell, but they may be written for execution in any desired shell.

Usage 
Obtaining software directly from the source code is a common procedure on Unix computers, and generally involves the following three steps: configuring the makefile, compiling the code, and finally installing the executable to standard locations. A configure script accomplishes the first of these steps. Using configure scripts is an automated method of generating makefiles before compilation to tailor the software to the system on which the executable is to be compiled and run. The final executable software is most commonly obtained by executing the following commands in a shell that is currently pointing to the directory containing the source code:

./configure
make
make install

One must type ./configure rather than simply configure to indicate to the shell that the script is in the current directory.  This is because, as a security precaution, Unix configurations don't search the current directory for executables.  So, to execute programs in that directory, one must explicitly specify their location.

Upon its completion, configure prints a report to config.log. Running ./configure --help gives a list of command line arguments, for enabling or disabling additional features such as:

./configure --libs="-lmpfr -lgmp"
./configure --prefix=/home/user/local

The first line includes the mpfr and gmp libraries. The second line tells make to install the final version in /home/user/local.

Often, a document with instructions is included.  This can be helpful if configure fails.  This file is commonly named INSTALL.

Generating configure 
Software developers simplify the challenge of cross-platform software development by using GNU Autotools.  These scripts query the system on which they run for environment settings, platform architecture, and the existence and location of required build and runtime dependencies.  They store the gathered information in configure.ac or the now deprecated configure.in to be read by configure during the installation phase.

Dependency checking 
In new development, library dependency checking has been done in great part using pkg-config via the m4 macro, PKG_CHECK_MODULES.  Before pkg-config gained popularity, separate m4 macros were created to locate files known to be included in the distribution of libraries depended upon.

History 
The first program to come with a configure script was rn by Larry Wall in 1984.  The script was written by hand and produced a jocular running commentary when executed.  It still survives as part of the build system of the trn program.

Since then, an ecosystem of programs has grown up to automate the creation of configure scripts as far as possible, of which the most common is the GNU Autoconf system.

See also 
 Autoconf
 Software build
 GNU Build System

References 

Compiling tools
Linux configuration utilities
Unix programming tools
configure